Nikolayev was the lead ship of the s of the Soviet Navy. She was launched on 19 December 1969 and commissioned on 31 December 1971 at the 61 Communards Shipyard. On 8 February 1972, she became part of the 30th Surface Ship Division of the Black Sea Fleet. Between 26 September–1 October 1973, she paid a visit to Split, Yugoslavia, and between 15–21 April 1981 to Havana, Cuba. On 9 April 1984 she was reassigned to the Pacific Fleet. On 16 July 1986 at night, she collided with destroyer  during the exercises in the Sea of Japan. After light repairs at Dalzavod, Vladivostok, she made a transition to Sevastopol, and then Nikolayev. On 1 November 1987, Nikolayev was delivered to Nikolayev for major repairs. In April 1992, the repairs were cancelled and on 29 October 1992, she was decommissioned. On 10 August 1994, she was towed for scrapping in India.

References

Kara-class cruisers
Ships built in the Soviet Union
1969 ships
Cold War cruisers of the Soviet Union